Patrick Raphael Grace (31 October 1900 – 6 January 1975) was an Australian politician.

Born in Corowa to farmer John Grace and Jane Elizabeth Maher, he was educated at Yanco Public School and worked on his father's farm as a roadmaker, opening as a stock and station agent in 1920. On 15 October 1930 he married Eileen Clayton, with whom he had three children. He was secretary of the Yanco branch of the Labor Party, and also entered a partnership with a butchery. In 1952 he was elected to the New South Wales Legislative Council. In 1959 he was expelled from the party for opposing the bill to abolish the Legislative Council; he was subsequently a member of the Independent Labor Group. Grace left the Council in 1964; he died in 1975 at Yanco.

References

1900 births
1975 deaths
Members of the New South Wales Legislative Council
Independent Labor Group politicians
Australian Labor Party members of the Parliament of New South Wales
20th-century Australian politicians
Australian stock and station agents